Emanuel Yonovych Kwiring (Kviring) (13 September 1888 – 26 November 1937) was a Soviet politician and statesman.

Born into a German family in Friesenthal, in the Samara Governorate of the Russian Empire (present-day Novolipovka, Sovetsky District, Saratov Oblast, Russia), he became a socialist activist and politician (Socialist-Revolutionary Party from 1906 to 1912, and Bolshevik Party beginning in 1912).

After World War I and the Bolshevik Revolution, he was a leader of the Communist Party (Bolsheviks) of Ukraine (October 1918 - March 1919, and April 1923 - March 1925). He was an opponent of the "Ukrainization" policy, so he had to leave Kharkiv for Moscow. Then he worked as an economist in the State Planning Committee (Gosplan).

In 1937, he was arrested and executed by NKVD. In 1956, Kwiring was posthumously rehabilitated by a decision of the USSR Supreme Court.

References

1888 births
1937 deaths
People from Sovetsky District, Saratov Oblast
People from Novouzensky Uyezd
Russian people of German descent
Old Bolsheviks
Central Committee of the Communist Party of the Soviet Union members
First Secretaries of the Communist Party of Ukraine (Soviet Union)
Great Purge victims from Russia
Soviet rehabilitations
Soviet bankers